Kim Jin-woo (Hangul: 김진우; born September 1, 1986), known by his stage name Bassagong (뱃사공), is a South Korean rapper. He released his debut studio album, Chulhangsa on July 23, 2015.

Controversy 
In 2022, rapper Don Mill's wife accused Bassagong of filming her body without her consent and sharing it to a group chat in 2018. Seoul Mapo Police Station investigated the issue and sent the case to the prosecution.

Discography

Studio albums

Extended plays

Singles

Awards and nominations

References

1986 births
Living people
South Korean male rappers
South Korean hip hop singers
21st-century South Korean male singers